Gogita Arkania (born 26 May 1984) is a Georgian karateka. He is a two-time gold medalist at the World Karate Championships (2014 and 2021). He also represented Georgia at the 2020 Summer Olympics in Tokyo, Japan.

Career 

He won the gold medal in the men's kumite 84 kg event at the 2014 World Karate Championships in Bremen, Germany.

In 2017, he competed in the men's kumite 84 kg event at the World Games held in Wrocław, Poland. He lost two out of three matches in the elimination round and he did not advance to the semi-finals.

At the 2019 European Games held in Minsk, Belarus, he won one of the bronze medals in the men's +84 kg event.

In 2021, he qualified at the World Olympic Qualification Tournament held in Paris, France to compete at the 2020 Summer Olympics in Tokyo, Japan. In August 2021, he competed in the men's +75 kg event at the Olympics. He was also the flag bearer for Georgia during the closing ceremony. In November 2021, he won the gold medal in the men's +84 kg event at the World Karate Championships held in Dubai, United Arab Emirates.

Achievements

References

External links 

 

Living people
1984 births
Place of birth missing (living people)
Male karateka from Georgia (country)
Competitors at the 2017 World Games
European Games bronze medalists for Georgia (country)
Karateka at the 2019 European Games
European Games medalists in karate
Karateka at the 2020 Summer Olympics
20th-century people from Georgia (country)
21st-century people from Georgia (country)